Rashid Nugmanov (also written Rachid Nougmanov; ; born March 19, 1954, in Alma-Ata, Kazakhstan) is a Kazakh film director, dissident, political activist and founder of the Kazakh New Wave cinema movement.

Film career 

Rashid Nugmanov was born into a Muslim Kazakh family on March 19, 1954.  After graduating in 1977 from the Architectural Institute in Alma-Ata, Nugmanov enrolled at the prestigious Moscow State Film Institute (VGIK), the world's first institute of cinematography in 1984. His directorial debut, The Needle, premiered in September 1988 at the "Golden Duke" Festival in Odessa, where it won the Un Certain Regard prize. Starring popular Soviet rock musician Viktor Tsoi, it was one of the first films to break the taboo against talking about drug addiction in the Soviet Union. The film was released in the USSR in February 1989 with 1,000 prints in circulation and became a box office hit viewed by over 30 million cinemagoers. The film was also a critical success, winning First Prize at the Nuremberg Film Festival and initiating the "Kazakh New Wave". He declared, in 1990, the motto of the New Wave of Kazakh cinema: "We demand no unified philosophy nor uniform artistic views on art. We are unified, instead, in our freedom and love of art". Nugmanov served as President of the Union of Kazakh Filmmakers from 1989 until 1992, when he wrote, directed and produced The Wild East, a post-apocalyptic punk samurai Ostern which attracted international acclaim at film festivals in Venice, Los Angeles, and Tokyo, and was awarded the Prix Special du Jury in Valenciennes, France. The film marked the end of both the Kazakh New Wave and Nugmanov's active directorial career, although he continued to write screenplays throughout the 1990s.

Activism 

Nugmanov moved to Paris, France, in 1993 and currently serves as the General Director of the International Freedom Network, a London-based think tank created to foster democracy in the former Soviet Union. A harsh critic of the political regime of Nursultan Nazarbaev, which he has decried as a mafia, Nugmanov has been responsible for the international relations of dissident organisations including the Forum for Democratic Forces of Kazakhstan and Central Asia, Republican People's Party of Kazakhstan, Democratic Choice of Kazakhstan, and For a Just Kazakhstan.

Filmography 
 The Needle Remix (2010)
 The Wild East (1993)
 The Needle (1988)
 Iskusstvo byt smirnym (1987)
 Yahha (1986)
 Zgga (1977)
 The Snow Band (1971)

References

Further reading 

Plakhov, Andrei, "Soviet Cinema into the 90's" in Sight and Sound (London), Spring 1989.
Ciesol, Forrest, "Kazakhstan Wave", in Sight and Sound (London), Fall 1989.
Horton, Andrew, "Nomad from Kazakhstan: An Interview with Rashid Nugmanov", in Film Criticism, Summer 1990.
Pruner, Ludmila Zebrina, "The New Wave in Kazakh Cinema" in Slavic Review, Vol. 51, No. 4. (Winter, 1992), pp. 791–801.
Eisner, Ken, "Legit Review", Variety, 1993-12-20.

External links 

Rashid Nugmanov at The New York Times

1954 births
Living people
Civil rights activists
Dissidents
Free speech activists
Kazakhstani film directors
Kazakhstani politicians
Kazakhstani writers
Soviet film directors
Kazakhstani democracy activists
New Wave